The following is a list of episodes for Flipper, a television series broadcast by NBC in the United States from 1964 to 1967. The series comprises 88 episodes, all in color.



Series overview

Episodes

Season 1 (1964–65)

Season 2 (1965–66)

Season 3 (1966–67) 

Lists of American children's television series episodes
Lists of American action television series episodes